Ogura Yonesuke Itoh (1870–1940) was a Japanese-American artist.  He was born in Japan in 1870.  At 25 years of age, he jumped ship in Hawaii and hid from the authorities in Punchbowl Crater.  He became a member of Hawaii’s volcano school of landscape painters.  Ogura is considered to be the first ethnically Japanese painter of any stature to paint Hawaiian subjects.  His paintings closely resemble those of Jules Tavernier.  Itoh left many of his paintings unsigned, possibly because he was in Hawaii illegally, and some of these unsigned paintings have been incorrectly attributed to Tavernier.  Ogura died in 1940.

The Honolulu Museum of Art usually has at least one painting by Ogura Yonesuke Itoh on display with other examples of the volcano school.

References
 Severson, Don R., Finding Paradise, Island Art in Private Collections, University of Hawaii Press, 2002, 98-99.

External links

1870 births
1940 deaths
19th-century American painters
American male painters
20th-century American painters
Japanese painters
American landscape painters
Volcano School painters
American artists of Japanese descent
Japanese emigrants to the United States
19th-century American male artists
20th-century American male artists